Harzhis is a village in the Tatev Municipality of the Syunik Province in Armenia.

Demographics

Population 
According to the official census in 2011, the population of the village is 879, down from 1,014 in 2010, up from 831 at the 2001 census.

Gallery

References

External links 
 Harzhis village: the symbol of pre-Christian past

Populated places in Syunik Province